USS Nahasho (YTB-535/YTM-535) was a Hisada-class tug boat.  Its name comes from a Navajo word meaning “it is damp.”

Assigned to the 1st Fleet, Nahasho operated in Hawaiian waters until placed out of service, in reserve, at Pearl Harbor in November 1947. Reactivated in June 1949, she was transferred to the east coast to serve the 5th Naval District, headquartered at Norfolk. Redesignated YTM–535 in February 1962, Nahasho continued, into 1970, to render towing, fire fighting and other services of her type to naval vessels and commands in the Tide Water region of Virginia.

References

External links
 Photo gallery at navsource.org

Tugs of the United States Navy
Ships built in Morris Heights, Bronx
1945 ships